RFA Eddybeach (A132) was an Eddy class coastal tanker of the Royal Fleet Auxiliary of the United Kingdom. The ship mainly saw service in the Mediterranean, quite often at Gibraltar where it functioned as a water carrier. In 1964 Eddybeach was disposed of by sale to Greece.

Eddybeach can be seen in the background during the scene depicting Lional 'Buster' Crabb's first dive in Gibraltar harbour in the film The Silent Enemy (1958).

References
 Eddy-Class Coastal Tankers
 Historical RFA

Eddy-class coastal tankers
1951 ships
Ships built in Dundee